The ISSF World Cup was introduced by the International Shooting Sport Federation in 1986 to provide a homogeneous system for qualification to the Olympic shooting competitions. It still is carried out in the Olympic shooting events, with four competitions per year in each event. For the best shooters there is since 1988 a World Cup Final.

World Cup Final
The World Cup Final in rifle and pistol is often, but not always, held in Munich as the ISSF shooting season ending competition. The location and date of the World Cup Final in shotgun are more flexible. To the Final, the following shooters are qualified:
 The defending Olympic, World, ISSF World Cup Final champions.
 Silver and bronze medalists of either the last Olympic or the World Championship, whichever competition that was most recently held.
 The eight shooters that have made the best performances at the World Cup competitions during the year. For rating the performances, a special score system is used by taking into account of both the rank and the score achieved in the competitions.
 As many as two shooters can be nominated by the host country to compete in two of the World Cup Final events if no one from the host country qualifies.

Seasons and venues
The venues are decided by the ISSF from time to time. However, some are more common than others. Two World Cups in rifle and pistol events are almost always held in Munich and Milan. The other two are usually held outside Europe, in places like Fort Benning, Buenos Aires, Seoul, Changwon or Sydney. Some common locations for the shotgun competitions are Nicosia, Lonato, New Delhi, and Americana, São Paulo. A new location for the shotgun competitions is held in Kerrville, Texas located in the Hill Country of Texas.

In Olympic years, an early World Cup is held at the Olympic venue and considered a Pre-Olympic test event.

Rifle and pistol

Shotgun

Running target (discontinued)

Spin-offs
The lack for a World Cup in the non-Olympic events has led to the creation of a European Cup by the European Shooting Confederation, based on largely the same rules as the ISSF World Cup. Originally it consisted of 300 metre rifle three positions, 300 metre rifle prone and 300 metre standard rifle, but since the 2005 season there is also a European Cup in 25 metre center-fire pistol and 25 metre standard pistol.

Since 2016, there has also been a separate world cup specifically for junior shooters.

Multi-Medalists
In this table the shooters with at least 7 gold medals won in the World Cup stages.

References

External links 
 Official Website

 
ISSF shooting competitions
Shooting